College of Engineering Trikaripur is a  government self-financing engineering college located in north Kerala. It was established in 2000 under the auspices of the Co-operative Academy of Professional Education (CAPE), an autonomous society under the Government of Kerala. The college is affiliated to APJ Abdul Kalam Technological University. The admissions are as per the list forwarded by the Controller of Entrance Examinations, Kerala and functioning of the college is as per the rules and regulations formulated by the Government of Kerala and CAPE.

References

External links 
 

Engineering colleges in Kerala
Colleges in Kasaragod district
Educational institutions established in 2000
2000 establishments in Kerala